Aldershot Command was a Home Command of the British Army.

History

After the success of the Chobham Manoeuvres of 1853, reformers of the British Army decided to create a permanent training camp at Aldershot. To begin the preliminary work a small party of NCOs and men of the Royal Engineers arrived in November 1853 on the site of the present Princes Gardens in the town making them the first soldiers to arrive in Aldershot. These engineers were responsible for surveying and making the preliminary arrangements for The Camp at Aldershot. The Camp was established at Aldershot in 1854 on the recommendation of the Commander-in-Chief, Viscount Hardinge. During the Crimean War, regiments of Militia embodied for home defence were housed at the camp, and the Brigade of Guards used it for summer training, and were reviewed by Queen Victoria.

After the Crimean War, a division of Regular troops was permanently based at Aldershot, and ‘the Division at Aldershot’ (including artillery at Christchurch, Hampshire, and cavalry at Hounslow, Middlesex), became one of the most important home commands of the British Army.

In January 1876 a ‘Mobilization Scheme for the forces in Great Britain and Ireland’ was published, with the ‘Active Army’ divided into eight army corps based on the major Commands and Districts. 2nd Corps was to be formed within Aldershot Command, based at Aldershot. This scheme disappeared in 1881, when the districts were retitled ‘District Commands’. In 1898 (when Queen Victoria's son, the Duke of Connaught, was General Officer Commanding (GOC)) Aldershot Command was ranked I on the list. A purpose-built command headquarters was completed in 1895.

The 1901 Army Estimates introduced by St John Brodrick allowed for six army corps based on six regional commands. As outlined in a paper published in 1903, I Corps was to be formed in a reconstituted Aldershot Command, with HQ at Aldershot. General Sir Redvers Buller was appointed acting General Officer Commanding-in-Chief (GOCinC) of I Corps in April 1903.

Under Army Order No 28 of 1907 the Home Commands were reorganised to provide a basis for the British Expeditionary Force (BEF).

Composition of Aldershot Command 1907
The composition was as follows:
1st Cavalry Brigade (Brig-Gen Hon Julian Byng)

1st Division (Maj-Gen James Grierson)
1st Brigade Aldershot				
2nd Brigade Blackdown			
3rd Brigade Bordon				
Three Field Artillery Brigades (each of three batteries) Royal Field Artillery
One Field Artillery (Howitzer) Brigade RFA
Two Field Companies Royal Engineers				
Two Divisional Telegraph Companies RE

2nd Division (Maj-Gen Bruce Hamilton)
4th (Guards) Brigade London
5th Brigade Aldershot
6th Brigade Aldershot
Three Field Artillery Brigades RFA
Two Field Companies RE

Army Troops
1st & 2nd Air Line Companies, RE
1st & 2nd Cable Telegraph Companies RE
1st & 2nd Wireless Telegraph Companies RE
1st & 2nd Balloon Companies RE
1st & 3rd Bridging Train RE

First World War
When the BEF was sent to France on the outbreak of the First World War in August 1914, Aldershot Command provided the basis for I Corps under Lieutenant-General Sir Douglas Haig. The Territorial Force and Special Reserve then took over home defence, with the assembly of Central Force beginning on 18 August 1914. First Army of Central Force was headquartered at Aldershot, with the Highland Division (later 51st (Highland) Division) and Highland Mounted Brigade of the TF under command. For the first two years of the war, command at Aldershot was divided between the Major-General, Administration (Major-General Alexander Hamilton-Gordon) and the commander of Aldershot Training Centre (General Sir Archibald Hunter). Aldershot Command was reinstated in 1916 under Hunter.

Second World War

In 1939, Regular Troops reporting to Aldershot Command included 1st Infantry Division and 2nd Infantry Division.

On the outbreak of the Second World War in September 1939, a similar process to August 1914 was repeated when the GOC-in-C Aldershot Command (Sir John Dill) became GOC I Corps in the new BEF which was despatched to France. Unlike the other Home Commands, Aldershot had no Coast divisions or other defence forces under its command, and was solely responsible for providing drafts and reserve formations. In 1941 the Command was downgraded to ‘Aldershot Area’ within a new South-Eastern Command. South Eastern Command ceased to exist at the end of 1944, and Aldershot was transferred to Southern Command, without its own GOC.

Post-War
GOCs were appointed to Aldershot District from 1944 to 1967, when it disappeared in the reorganisation that led to Southern Command being redesignated GHQ UK Land Forces. From 1968, the HQ of South East District was at Aldershot; it was renamed Southern District in 1992, and HQ 4th Division in 1995.

General Officers Commanding-in-Chief
Appointments as General Officers Commanding (GOC) and General Officers Commanding-in-Chief (GOC-in-C) have included:

The Division at Aldershot
1857 Lieutenant General Sir William Knollys
1 July 1860 Lieutenant General Sir John Pennefather
1 October 1865 Lieutenant General Sir James Scarlett
1 November 1870 General Sir James Grant
14 April 1875 General Sir Thomas Steele

Aldershot District Command
1 July 1880 General Sir Daniel Lysons
1 August 1883 Lieutenant General Sir Archibald Alison
1 January 1889 Lieutenant General Sir Evelyn Wood VC
9 October 1893 (GOC-in-C) General the Duke of Connaught
9 October 1898 General Sir Redvers Buller VC
temporary appointments while Buller commanded in South Africa:
9 October 1899 Lieutenant General Thomas Kelly-Kenny CB
15 December 1899 General Alexander Moore
17 September 1900 Lieutenant General Sir William Butler KCB

Lieutenant-General Commanding Troops at Aldershot, and 1st Army Corps
10 January 1901 General Sir Redvers Buller VC GCB KCMG (on his arrival back from South Africa)
25 October 1901 Lieutenant General Sir Henry Hildyard, KCB (temporary when Buller was dismissed, pending the return from South Africa of French)
15 September 1902 Lieutenant General Sir John French
In 1905 title changed to GOC-in-C.In 1907 title changed to Aldershot Corps.In 1908 became Aldershot Command again.

Aldershot Command
1 December 1907 Lieutenant General Sir Horace Smith-Dorrien
1 March 1912 Lieutenant General Sir Douglas Haig

GOC and Major General Administration, Aldershot Command
1914-16 Major General Alexander Hamilton-Gordon

GOC Aldershot Training Centre
1914-16 General Sir Archibald Hunter

Aldershot Command
April 1916 General Sir Archibald Hunter
1 October 1917 General Sir Archibald Murray
15 November 1919 General Lord Rawlinson
2 November 1920 General The Earl of Cavan
1922 to 1923 Lieutenant General Sir Thomas Morland
1 March 1923 Lieutenant General Sir Philip Chetwode
1 March 1927 Lieutenant General Sir David Campbell
30 June 1931 Lieutenant General Sir Charles Harington
12 October 1933 Lieutenant General Sir Francis Gathorne-Hardy
12 October 1937 Lieutenant General Sir John Dill
3 September 1939 to 1940 Lieutenant General Sir Charles Broad
7 March 1940 Lieutenant General Michael Barker
21 May 1940 Major General Geoffrey Raikes
25 June 1940 Major General Dudley Johnson VC

South Eastern Command
Commanders included:
15 February 1941 Lieutenant General Sir Bernard Paget
25 December 1941 Lieutenant General Sir Bernard Montgomery
7 August 1942 Lieutenant General Sir John Swayne
19 March 1944 Lieutenant General Sir Edmond Schreiber
25 September 1944 Lieutenant General Eric Miles

Aldershot District
September 1944 Major General Charles Norman
December 1944 Major General Henry Curtis
September 1945 Major General Robert Ross
September 1946 Major General Sir Noel Holmes
November 1946 Major General Joseph Baillon
November 1948 Major General William Dimoline
1 September 1951 Major General John Eldridge
1953 Major General Edward Burke-Gaffney
8 February 1954 Major General Sir Douglas Campbell
7 February 1956 Major General Ronald Bramwell-Davis
7 February 1960 Major General Sir Denis O’Connor
8 November 1961 Major General John Francis Metcalfe
7 November 1963 Major General Patrick Man
4 July 1966 Major General Charles Stainforth

References

Commands of the British Army
Military in Aldershot